FLI may refer to:
 Fli, other name for the Vlie
 Atlantic Airways, a Faroese airline
 Fali of Mubi, a language of Nigeria
 Five Little Indians, an Indian rock band
 Flia, an Albanian dish
 FLIC (file format), an animation storage format
 FLII, a gene
 Flixton railway station in England
 Friedrich Loeffler Institute, a German veterinary research centre
 Future and Freedom, Italian political grouping
 Future of Life Institute, a research institute and outreach organization working to mitigate existential risks facing humanity